Jared Rosser (born 21 February 1997) is a Welsh rugby union player who plays for Dragons regional team as a winger

Rosser made his debut for the Dragons regional team in 2017 having previously played for Bedwas RFC and Ebbw Vale RFC.

References

External links 
Dragons profile

1997 births
Living people
Bedwas RFC players
Dragons RFC players
Ebbw Vale RFC players
Rugby union players from Abergavenny
Welsh rugby union players
Rugby union wings